The canton of Marly is an administrative division of the Nord department, northern France. It was created at the French canton reorganisation which came into effect in March 2015. Its seat is in Marly.

It consists of the following communes:

Condé-sur-l'Escaut
Crespin
Curgies
Estreux
Hergnies
Marly
Odomez
Préseau
Quarouble
Quiévrechain
Rombies-et-Marchipont
Saint-Aybert
Saultain
Sebourg
Thivencelle
Vicq
Vieux-Condé

References

Cantons of Nord (French department)